The Kids Praise Album! (also known as Kids' Praise! 1: An Explosion of Happiness) is an American 1980 Maranatha! children's Christian music album that features Psalty the Singing Songbook.  It is the very first album in a long-running series of Kids Praise! and other Psalty related albums.  The album was written by Debby Kerner & Ernie Rettino (Mr. Rettino plays Psalty). This album has been credited to "The Maranatha! Kids" and to "The Kids' Praise Kids."

Track listing/Plot
Some children discovered a book despite the fact that books do not weep; he used to have a name that sounds like other common books and resembles a hymnal, but he explained to them why: without kids, kid's praise music would not be accessible. The students selected to sing 10 of the songs mentioned below after reaching an understanding.
"Amen Praise the Lord"
"Behold What Manner of Love"
"Jesus, Name Above All Names"
"The Butterfly Song" (If I Were a Butterfly)
"Seek Ye First"
"Heaven is a Wonderful Place"
"I John 4:7-8 (Beloved)"
"The Wa Wa Song"
"Father I Adore You"
"Children of the Lord"

References
 Maranatha! Music Album Discography

1980 albums
Debby Kerner & Ernie Rettino albums